The Central Drugs Standard Control Organisation (CDSCO) is India's national regulatory body for cosmetics,  pharmaceuticals and medical devices. It serves a similar function to the European Medicines Agency of the European Union, the PMDA of Japan, the Food and Drug Administration (FDA) of the United States, and the Medicines and Healthcare products Regulatory Agency of the United Kingdom, and the National Medical Products Administration (NMPA) of China. The Indian government has announced its plan to bring all medical devices, including implants and contraceptives under a review of the Central Drugs and Standard Control Organisation (CDSCO).

Within the CDSCO, the Drug Controller General of India (DCGI) regulates pharmaceutical and medical devices and is positioning within the Ministry of Health and Family Welfare. The DCGI is advised by the Drug Technical Advisory Board (DTAB) and the Drug Consultative Committee (DCC). Divided into zonal offices, each one carries out pre-licensing and post-licensing inspections, post-market surveillance, and drug recalls (where necessary). Manufacturers who deal with the authority required to name an Authorized Indian Representative (AIR) to represent them in all dealings with the CDSCO in India.

Though the CDSCO has a good track record with the World Health Organization, it has also been accused of past collusion with independent medical experts and pharmaceutical companies. CDSCO plans to open an international office in Beijing, China.

Divisions 
Central Drugs Standard Control Organization has 8 divisions:

 BA/BE
 New Drugs
 Medical Device & Diagnostics
 DCC-DTAB
 Import & Registration
 Biological
 Cosmetics
 Clinical Trials

References

External links

SUGAM Online Licensing

Medical and health organisations based in India
Food safety organizations
National agencies for drug regulation
Regulators of biotechnology products
Ministry of Health and Family Welfare
Regulatory agencies of India